Paulshof is a suburb of Johannesburg, South Africa. It is located in Region 2 and Region 3.

The village of Paulshof is bounded by the Western Bypass on the South, Leeuwkop Estate on the North, Sunninghill on the East and Lone Hill on the West.

Paulshof is known as the "Garden Village of the North" by locals due to its proximity to green spaces such as the Rietfontein Nature Reserve.

Places of interest in the suburb include:
Cambridge Crossing Shopping Centre, Reitfontein Nature reserve, the German Country Club, St Peters school, and the Rivonia Recreation & Sports Club, Barnyard Theatre (which has now closed down), Nova Pioneer School Campus and much more

Paulshof is also home to many independent small businesses, such as June Day Productions, Luca's Restaurant, and many more.

Vino Reddy from the Democratic Alliance (DA) is the ward councilor of Paulshof.

References

Johannesburg Region A